I Love You Like a Brother is the debut studio album by Australian singer-songwriter Alex Lahey. It was released on 6 October 2017 and peaked at number 15 on the ARIA Charts.

At the J Awards of 2017, the album was nominated for Australian Album of the Year.

At the ARIA Music Awards of 2018, the album was nominated for ARIA Award for Breakthrough Artist – Release.

Track listing

Personnel 
Musicians

 Alex Lahey – vocals, guitar, keys, alto saxophone, bass guitar, marimba, tubular bells, glockenspiel, xylophone, programming, timpani, vibraphone
 Samuel Humphrey – guitar
 Jonathan Skourletos – bass guitar
 Oscar Dawson – guitar, keys, percussion, background vocals, producer, engineer
 Ali Barter – background vocals
 Bec Sandridge – background vocals
 Oliver Whitehead – tenor saxophone
 Darcie Foley – trombone
 Liam McGorry – trumpet

Additional personnel

 Aaron Dobos – engineer
 Matt Redlich – mastering
 Giulia Giannini McGauran – front cover image
 Felicity Case-Mejia – cover design

Charts

References

2017 debut albums
Alex Lahey albums